Podarcis cretensis, the Cretan wall lizard, is a species of lacertid lizard endemic to Crete (including its satellite islands).

Until 2008, these lizards were considered a subspecies of Podarcis erhardii. Genetic analysis, however, revealed that it is a separate species closely related to Podarcis peloponnesiacus.

References

cretensis
Reptiles described in 1952
Lizards of Europe
Endemic fauna of Crete
Taxa named by Otto von Wettstein